Joseph Rolette, Jr. (23 October 1820 – 16 May 1871) was an American fur trader and politician during Minnesota's territorial era and the Civil War. His father was Jean Joseph Rolette, often referred to as Joe Rolette the Elder, a French-Canadian and trader himself. Joseph Rolette's mother was Jane Fisher, who married Joe Rolette, Sr. in 1818 when she was either 13 or 14 years old. Jane's relatives took young Joseph to New York. Joseph's parents never divorced due to their Catholic faith, but became separated in 1836. As part of the settlement, Rolette Sr. built what is today known as the Brisbois House for his estranged wife on Water Street, St. Feriole Island, Prairie du Chien, WI.

As his sense of adventure developed, Joe Jr. headed back west in 1840 and by the time he was 21 he was working for his father's partners in the Red River valley area of Minnesota. Some names in Minnesota history (Henry Hastings Sibley and Ramsey Crooks) were active and running a fur trading company in the area.  Whilst in their service, Joseph Rolette rebuilt a trading post at Pembina, being responsible for the building and defense of the post, as well as managing the business being conducted there. The area where the Pembina Trail crossed the Red Lake River is now Red Lake Falls, MN.

In 1842 young Rolette put into a place a unique method of transportation. He created a line of carts that ran on the Red River Trails between Pembina and the head of Mississippi navigation at Mendota, Minnesota. As a result, a substantial portion of the trade enjoyed by the Hudson's Bay Company in Canada was diverted to the United States. Rolette ran this concern with his mother's brother. By this time the trading post had grown and a Canadian native, Norman W. Kittson, was managing it.  Kittson adopted the system of Red River ox carts, growing and adding more lines until it consisted of several thousand vehicles.

During the late 1840s Rolette also had a hand in defending the posts, both from commercial rivals and unfriendly Native Americans. At one point he burned down a rival post which was trading whisky for furs, a transaction that was illegal during that time. In 1845 he married Angelique Jerome. Together they had eleven children.

In 1851 he was elected to the Minnesota Territorial Legislature and served four terms. It was from his time in the legislature that the best-known story about him originates. A bill making St. Peter the capital of Minnesota was about to be enacted and, as he was chairman of the enrollment committee, bills of this nature had to pass through him. Rolette took physical possession of the document and disappeared for the rest of the session, not returning until it was too late to pass any more bills. St. Peter did not become the capital and it ended up in St. Paul where it remains today.  According to the story, he spent the week away from the legislature drinking and playing poker in a hotel room with some friends. According to other versions of the story, the "hotel room" was actually a brothel. From 1857 to 1858, he served in the first Minnesota State Constitutional Convention and the Minnesota State Senate.

During the Civil War he was unable to get a commission in the Union army and by the end of the war had lost much of his fortune. His health declined and he died on May 16, 1871.

Cited references

Further reading
Compendium of History and Biography of Central and Northern Minnesota (Chicago, Geo. A. Ogle & Co., 1904), page 49.
Joe Rolette Politics

External links 
 Joseph Rolette in MNopedia, the Minnesota Encyclopedia 
 
Biography at the Dictionary of Canadian Biography Online
 Early Trolley Transportation
 Yellowpages.state.mn
Minnesota County Biographies
Souvenir program, Joseph Rolette Memorial dedication, Pembina, North Dakota, October 13, 1937 from the Digital Horizons website

1820 births
1871 deaths
People from Prairie du Chien, Wisconsin
American fur traders
Pre-statehood history of Minnesota
Members of the Minnesota Territorial Legislature
Minnesota state senators
19th-century American politicians